Huajian Gao (born December 7, 1963) is a Chinese-American mechanician who is widely known for his contributions to the field of solid mechanics, particularly on the micro- and nanomechanics of thin films, hierarchically structured materials, and cell-nanomaterial interactions. He is a Distinguished University Professor at Nanyang Technological University in Singapore and Walter H. Annenberg Professor Emeritus of Engineering at Brown University. He is the editor-in-chief of Journal of the Mechanics and Physics of Solids.

Gao was elected a member of the National Academy of Engineering in 2012 for contributions to micromechanics of thin films and hierarchically structured materials. In 2021 he received the Timoshenko Medal for "pioneering contributions to nanomechanics of engineering and biological systems."

Education and career
Huajian Gao was born in Chengdu, Sichuan on December 7, 1963.

He received his B.S. in Engineering Mechanics from Xi'an Jiaotong University of China in 1982, and his M.S. and Ph.D. in Engineering Science from Harvard University in 1984 and 1988, respectively. He taught at Stanford University between 1988 and 2002, where he was promoted to Associate Professor with tenure in 1994 and to full Professor in 2000. He joined the Max Planck Society in 2001 as a Director at the Max Planck Institute for Metals Research in Stuttgart, Germany. In 2006 he moved to Brown University as the Walter H. Annenberg Professor of Engineering. In 2019, he joined Nanyang Technological University Nanyang Technological University as 2019 Distinguished University Professors, also jointly affiliated as scientific director of Institute of High Performance Computing, A*STAR, Singapore. Gao is the editor of the Journal of the Mechanics and Physics of Solids.

Research
Gao has a background in applied mechanics and engineering science. His research interests span over Solid Mechanics, Nanomechanics and Biomechanics. He works on mechanics of thin films and hierarchically structured materials, mechanics of biological and bio-inspired materials, mechanics of nanostructured and nanotwinned materials, mechanics of cell adhesion, mechanics of cell-nanomaterials interactions, mechanics of energy storage systems, and mechanics of metallic glasses.

Awards
Gao received academic honors including a John Simon Guggenheim Fellowship in 1995 and the Humboldt Prize from Germany and Rodney Hill Prize in Solid Mechanics from the International Union of Theoretical and Applied Mechanics (IUTAM) in 2012. He was elected to the National Academy of Engineering in 2012, to the Chinese Academy of Sciences (as a foreign academician) in 2015, the German Academy of Sciences Leopoldina in 2017, the National Academy of Sciences in 2018 and American Academy of Arts and Sciences in 2019.

In 2021 he received the Timoshenko Medal for "pioneering contributions to nanomechanics of engineering and biological systems."

References

External links
 Huajian Gao's group homepage
 
Full CV at Brown University.

1963 births
Living people
People from Chengdu
Engineers from Sichuan
Members of the United States National Academy of Sciences
Members of the United States National Academy of Engineering
Foreign members of the Chinese Academy of Sciences
Harvard School of Engineering and Applied Sciences alumni
Chinese emigrants to the United States
Xi'an Jiaotong University alumni
Stanford University faculty
Brown University faculty
Educators from Sichuan
Members of the German Academy of Sciences Leopoldina
Max Planck Institute directors